The Journal of Food Process Engineering is a peer-reviewed scientific journal that covers research on applications of engineering to food and food processing. It was established in 1977 and is published by Wiley-Blackwell. The journal moved to online-only publication in 2011. According to the Journal Citation Reports, the journal has a 2020 impact factor of 2.356.

References

External links 
 

Bimonthly journals
Wiley-Blackwell academic journals
English-language journals
Publications established in 1977
Food science journals